The 2015 Tajik Cup was the 24th edition of the Tajik Cup. The cup winner qualified for the 2016 AFC Cup.

Last 16

Quarterfinal

Semifinals

Final

Scorers
7 goals:

 Davronjon Tukhtasunov - CSKA Pamir
 Nozim Babadjanov - Regar-TadAZ

5 goals:

 Fatkhullo Fatkhuloev - Istiklol
 Dilshod Vasiev - Istiklol
 Dilshod Bozorov - Khujand
 Shodibek Gafforov - Ravshan Kulob
 Kamil Saidov - Regar-TadAZ

4 goals:

 Manuchekhr Dzhalilov - Istiklol

3 goals:

 Akhtam Nazarov - Istiklol
 Akhtam Khamrakulov - Khujand
 Karomatullo Saidov - Vakhsh Qurghonteppa

2 goals:

 Samad Shohzukhurov - Barki Tajik
 Solomon Takyi - Barki Tajik
 Avaz Kamchinov - CSKA Dushanbe
 Andoh Napoleon - CSKA Pamir
 Shamsiddin Qosimov - CSKA Pamir
 Unknown - CSKA Pamir
 Mehrullo Boboev - Daleron-Uroteppa
 Parvizdzhon Umarbayev - Istiklol
 Dzhakhongir Ergashev - Khujand
 Dilshod Karimov - Khujand
 Unknown - Panjshir
 Akuffo Gershon Kwasi - Ravshan Kulob
 Bakhtiyor Qalandarov - Ravshan Kulob
 Abdurasul Rakhmonov - Ravshan Kulob
 Navruz Rustamov - Ravshan Kulob
 Farrukh Choriyev - Regar-TadAZ
 Rasul Payzov - Regar-TadAZ
 Komron Tursunov - Regar-TadAZ
 Tabrezi Davlatmir - Vakhsh Qurghonteppa

1 goals:

 Mehrodzhiddin Muzaffarov - Barki Tajik
 Vaysiddin Safarov - Barki Tajik
 Vohid Sohibnazar - Barki Tajik
 Firuz Yusupov - Barki Tajik
 Bakhronov Aziz - Candi
 Azam Hamroev - Chashma
 Jamoliddin Khodzhaev - Chashma
 Amine Nuraliev - Chashma
 Furugh Encodes - CSKA Pamir
 Sayod Kovussho - CSKA Pamir
 Komron Mirzonadzhot - CSKA Pamir
 Rustam Tolibov - CSKA Pamir
 Firdaus Musoev - Isfara
 Siyovush Asrori - Istiklol
 José Ballester - Istiklol
 Nuriddin Davronov - Istiklol
 Ziёvuddin Fuzaylov - Istiklol
 Romish Jalilov - Istiklol
 Khurshed Makhmudov - Istiklol
 Amirdzhon Safarov - Istiklol
 Ikrom Karimdzhon - Khujand
 Komron Mirzohon - Khujand
 Amir Rakhimov - Khujand
 Farkhod Tokhirov - Khujand
 Bahtovar Zokirov - Parvoz Bobojon Ghafurov
 Saidhoni Amrohon - Ravshan Kulob
 Hossein Sohrabi - Ravshan Kulob
 Firuz Karaev - Regar-TadAZ
 Sherzod Mahamadov - Regar-TadAZ
 Hurshed Dadoboev - Saroykamar Panj
 Jonibek Gafforov - Saroykamar Panj
 Naseem Mamadkulov - Saroykamar Panj
 Sohibdzhon Vakhobov - Saroykamar Panj
 Muhammadjon Hassan - Vakhsh Qurghonteppa
 Otabek Karimov - Vakhsh Qurghonteppa
 Himatullo Malodustov - Vakhsh Qurghonteppa
 Ehson Panjshanbe - Vakhsh Qurghonteppa

Own goals:

 Firdaus Musoev (26 July 2015 vs Vakhsh Qurghonteppa)
 Umed Sharipov (5 August 2015 vs Regar-TadAZ)

References

External links
Tajikistan Football Federation

Tajikistan Cup
Tajikistan
Tajik Cup